Duke of Santa Cruz was a title of nobility of the Empire of Brazil created by Emperor Pedro I of Brazil, dated from 5 November 1829, for his brother-in-law, Prince Auguste de Beauharnais, brother of Pedro's second wife Empress Amélie.

Five years later, in December 1834, Auguste became (the late) Pedro I's son-in-law, when he was chosen to marry the Emperor's eldest daughter, Queen Maria II of Portugal.

The toponym associated to this title concerns Santa Cruz, today a neighborhood in Rio de Janeiro.

List of the Dukes
 Auguste de Beauharnais (1810–1835), also 2nd Duke of Leuchtenberg, 2nd Prince of Eichstätt, and Prince consort of Portugal (1834–1835).

References

External links
Information on the Dukedom of Santa Cruz – Geneall.net;

Santa Cruz
Portuguese nobility
Brazilian noble titles
1829 establishments in Brazil

Empire of Brazil
Titles of nobility in the Americas